The following is a timeline of the international movement for open access to scholarly communication.

1940s-1990s 
 1942
 American sociologist Robert King Merton declares: "Each researcher must contribute to the 'common pot' and give up intellectual property rights to allow knowledge to move forward." 
 1971
 "World's first online digital library is launched, Project Gutenberg."
 1987
 Syracuse University in the US issues one of the world's first open access journals, New Horizons in Adult Education.
 1991
 14 August: ArXiv repository of physics research papers established at Los Alamos National Laboratory in the US.
 1994
 27 June: Stevan Harnad posts a "Subversive Proposal" for authors to archive their articles for free for everyone online.
 1998
 Brazil-based SciELO (Scientific Electronic Library Online) launched.
 Public Knowledge Project founded in Canada.
 Scholarly Publishing and Academic Resources Coalition founded in North America.
 1999
 October: Open Archives Initiative on interoperability standards holds its first meeting, in New Mexico, US.

2000s 
 2000
 BioMed Central publisher established.
 2001
 15 January: Creative Commons founded in the United States.
 Public Library of Science publisher active.
 Open Journal Systems free software published.
 SPARC Europe established to promote open access in Europe.
 2002
 14 February: Budapest Open Access Initiative statement issued.
 28 June: US-based OAIster catalog begins.
 2003
 11 April: Bethesda Statement on Open Access Publishing formed.
 22 October: Berlin Declaration on Open Access to Knowledge in the Sciences and Humanities published.
 25 December: Institutional Self-Archiving Policy Registry launched (later called ROARMAP).
 Redalyc (Red de Revistas Científicas de América Latina y El Caribe, España y Portugal) established in Mexico.
 2004
 UK Digital Curation Centre founded.
 Bielefeld Academic Search Engine launched by Bielefeld University, Germany.
 Publisher Springer begins "hybrid option 'Open Choice' for their full portfolio of over 1,000 subscription journals."
 30 January: Organisation for Economic Co-operation and Development issues "Declaration on Access to Research Data from Public Funding."
 2005
 Directory of Open Access Repositories begins publication.
 2007
 European Research Council issues "its first Scientific Council Guidelines for open access."
 2008
 Durham Statement on Open Access to Legal Scholarship written.
 7 April: United States National Institutes of Health Public Access Policy effected.
 2009
 12 January: European Commission-funded OpenAIRE project begins, supporting implementation of open access in Europe.
 Confederation of Open Access Repositories founded.

2010s 

 2010
 "Beall's list" of predatory open access publishers begins circulating.
 2011
 20 January: #icanhazPDF begins on Twitter.
 5 September: Sci-Hub launched by Alexandra Elbakyan.
 16 December: United States Research Works Act bill introduced.
 UK-based CORE (COnnecting REpositories) aggregation service founded.
 2012
 Knowledge Unlatched established.
 Pasteur4OA (Open Access Policy Alignment Strategies for European Union Research) begins.
 The Cost of Knowledge protest begins against high prices charged by large publisher Elsevier.
 22 October: Brussels Declaration signed, on open access to Belgian publicly funded research.
 2013
 PeerJ megajournal begins publication.
 Registry of Research Data Repositories begins operating.
 4 October: "Who's Afraid of Peer Review?" published in Science.
 2014
 FOSTER Project (Facilitate Open Science Training for European Research) begins.
 2016
 7 March: Open Data Button (browser extension) launched.
 2017
 April: UnpayWall Button (Browser extension) launched (90 million articles are indexed)
 10 October: Jussieu Call statement issued
 Plug-in search tool Canary Haz launched to enable access to PDF versions of articles (later renamed Kopernio.com).

See also 
 History of open access
 Open access journal: history
Declarations in support of OA
 Access to Knowledge movement

References

Further reading 
 
 . (Timeline)

External links 
  (Includes timeline)
 . Also:  Milestones. (News feed)
  Compilation of  Peter Suber's contributions to the history of open access, 1992–present.
  This timeline was created and initially maintained by Peter Suber, who crowd-sourced it in February 2009 by moving it to the Open Access Directory.

 
Academic publishing
Open access movement timeline
Electronic publishing
Scholarly communication
Free culture movement